Greater Shediac is the name given to the area encompassing the Town of Shediac in New Brunswick, Canada and its surroundings.  Most of this area is a tourist area along the Northumberland Strait mainly on portions of Route 134, Route 133 and Route 950.  Some of the areas mentioned below are included in the area of Greater Moncton.

List of towns, communities and cities
 Shediac
 Pointe-du-Chêne
 Grand-Barachois
 Scoudouc
 Shemogue
 Cormier Village
 Haute Aboujagane
 Cap-Pelé
 Shediac Bridge-Shediac River
 Grande-Digue
 Caissie Cape
 Cocagne

See also
 List of events in Greater Moncton
 Greater Moncton
Shediac Parish
Shediac Bay
 Scoudouc River
 Shediac River
 Shediac Island
 Parlee Beach, New Brunswick

Neighbouring areas
Greater Moncton
Tantramar Region

References

 
Metropolitan areas of New Brunswick
Geographic regions of New Brunswick